The Modoc sucker (Catostomus microps) is a rare species of freshwater fish native to northern California and southern Oregon. It feeds on algae, small invertebrates and detritus, and hides under stones, detritus and overhanging vegetation. It is found in only a few streams and is listed as an endangered species in California and the United States. Conservation measures have been put in place such as fencing the streams in which it lives from livestock. It was previously rated as "endangered" by the International Union for Conservation of Nature, but this rating has now been changed to "near threatened".

Description
This sucker is mature when it reaches 3 to 4 inches long; the adult is usually no more than 7 inches long but it rarely exceeds 13 inches. It has been observed to reach five years of age at the oldest.

Distribution
This fish is limited to a few creeks in northern California and southern Oregon, where its historical range was located in the Ash Creek and Turner Creek drainages in the basin of the Pit River, as well as the Goose Lake basin, which was once connected to the Pit River. It can currently be found in ten streams in this region.

The stream habitat has substrates of sediment and cobble with large amounts of detritus in the water that the fish uses for cover. It also uses overhanging banks, large rocks, and vegetation for cover. Spawning occurs in substrates with a lot of gravel. The fish eats algae, small invertebrates, and detritus.

Status
When the fish was placed on the US Endangered Species List it was threatened by the degradation of its habitat. Since then the habitat has been improved by the installation of livestock-excluding fences along waterways and other interventions. The creeks supporting the fish are relatively healthy today. The range of the fish is not currently being reduced. Introduced species of fish such as the largemouth bass are present but do not pose a serious threat to the sucker. In 2009 the United States Fish and Wildlife Service recommended the species be downlisted from endangered status to threatened status.

The fish was planned to be removed from the List of Endangered and Threatened Species on January 7, 2016, and has now been rated as "near threatened" by the International Union for Conservation of Nature.

References

Modoc sucker
Endemic fauna of the United States
Fish of the Western United States
Freshwater fish of the United States
Fauna of the Great Basin
Fauna of California
Natural history of Oregon
Endangered fauna of California
Fish described in 1908
Taxa named by Cloudsley Louis Rutter